Jazmyn Foberg (born February 2, 2000) is an American artistic gymnast. She was the 2014 junior national all-around and uneven bars champion, as well as a member of the United States Junior National Team. Starting in 2017, she is competing on the Florida Gators women's gymnastics team at the University of Florida.

Career

2014 
In August 2014, Foberg competed at the Secret U.S. Classic, where she placed fifth in the all-around, tied for third on vault, tied for sixth on uneven bars, placed seventh on balance beam, and tied for eleventh on floor exercise. Later that month, Foberg competed at the U.S. National Championships, where she won the all-around title ahead of favorites Nia Dennis and Norah Flatley, as well as the uneven bars. She also placed fourth on vault, ninth on beam, and fifth on floor.

On December 8, 2014, Foberg committed to the University of Florida. Foberg enrolled a year early in the fall of 2017.

2015 
In March 2015, Foberg made her international debut at the City of Jesolo Trophy. She won gold with the U.S. junior team, gold on vault, and bronze in the all-around.

Foberg participated in the 2015 U.S. Classic in July, winning gold on balance beam with a score of 14.650 and placing second on vault (14.800), third on uneven bars (14.100, tied with Jordan Chiles), and third in the all-around (57.400).

In August, Foberg competed at the National Championships, where she won silver medals in the all-around, vault, uneven bars, and balance beam.

2016
Foberg's senior debut came at the 2016 Secret U.S. Classic. However, she did not compete vault, and received relatively low scores of 13.850 on bars, 13.200 on balance beam, and 12.800 on floor exercise. She withdrew from the U.S. national championships due to a nagging ankle injury, forgoing her chance to compete at the Olympic Trials and make the 2016 Olympic team.

Collegiate career

Foberg began studies as a student-athlete at the University of Florida in the fall of 2017. During the 2018 competitive gymnastics season, she contributed performances on vault and uneven bars in all but one meet, with occasional performances on balance beam and floor exercise. She performed on vault and uneven bars with the team at the 2018 NCAA Women's Gymnastics Championship Finals Super Six, where University of Florida placed 3rd.

Foberg did not compete with the team during the 2019 gymnastics season due to recovering from elbow surgery.

Competitive history

References

2000 births
Living people
People from Berkeley Township, New Jersey
Sportspeople from Toms River, New Jersey
American female artistic gymnasts
Sportspeople from Ocean County, New Jersey
Florida Gators women's gymnasts
U.S. women's national team gymnasts
21st-century American women